Wanzhi South railway station is a railway station in Wanzhi District, Wuhu, Anhui, China. It is an intermediate station on the Shangqiu–Hangzhou high-speed railway. The station has two side platforms and two central bypass tracks.

History 
This station replaces Wanzhi railway station which was closed in January 2008. It opened with the second phase of the Shangqiu–Hangzhou high-speed railway on 28 June 2020.

References 

Railway stations in Anhui
Railway stations in China opened in 2020